Mitch Mathews (born April 15, 1991) is an American football wide receiver who is currently a free agent. He was signed by the Kansas City Chiefs as an undrafted free agent following the 2016 NFL Draft. He played college football at Brigham Young University from 2009 to 2015. He also served a two-year mission for The Church of Jesus Christ of Latter-day Saints in Orlando, Florida from 2009 to 2011.

College statistics

Professional career

Kansas City Chiefs
Mathews was signed by the Kansas City Chiefs on May 2, 2016 as an undrafted free agent. On August 30, 2016, Mathews was waived by the Chiefs.

Cleveland Browns
On October 11, 2016, Mathews was signed to the Browns' practice squad. He was released by the Browns on November 2, 2016.

Minnesota Vikings
On March 30, 2017, Mathews was signed by the Minnesota Vikings. He was waived on May 30, 2017.

Miami Dolphins
On June 8, 2017, Mathews was signed by the Miami Dolphins. He was waived on September 2, 2017.

References

External links
BYU Cougars bio
Kansas City Chiefs bio
Cleveland Browns bio

Living people
American Latter Day Saints
21st-century Mormon missionaries
Sportspeople from Beaverton, Oregon
Southridge High School (Beaverton, Oregon) alumni
American football wide receivers
BYU Cougars football players
Kansas City Chiefs players
Cleveland Browns players
Players of American football from Oregon
Minnesota Vikings players
Miami Dolphins players
1991 births